Sudhir Mahato was an Indian politician. He was elected to the Bihar Legislative Assembly and then Jharkhand Legislative Assembly from Ichagarh from 1990 Bihar Legislative Assembly election and 2005 Jharkhand Legislative Assembly election as a member of the Jharkhand Mukti Morcha. He was Deputy Chief Minister of Jharkhand under Madhu Koda from 14 September 2006 to 23 August 2008.

He died on 23 January 2014 due to a massive heart attack at Ghatsila in East Singhbhum district at the age of 53 years.

References

1961 births
2014 deaths
Members of the Bihar Legislative Assembly
Members of the Jharkhand Legislative Assembly
Jharkhand Mukti Morcha politicians
People from East Singhbhum district
Deputy chief ministers of Jharkhand